The Seizin Press was a small press, founded in 1927 by Laura Riding and Robert Graves in London from 1928 until 1935. From 1930 it was based in Majorca.

Besides work by Graves and Riding, the Seizin Press published works by Gertrude Stein, Len Lye, Honor Wyatt and James Reeves. It ceased on the outbreak of the Spanish Civil War; during the 1980s, a "New Seizin Press" was operated by an acquaintance of Graves.

Seizin Press Vero is owned and operated by the Laura (Riding) Jackson Foundation located in Vero Beach, Fl. The first volume "Decades" represents poetry by leading American poets who have participated in the Foundation's annual "Poetry & Barbecue." https://www.LRJF.org.

References

Book publishing companies of Spain
Publishing companies established in 1927
1936 disestablishments in Spain
British companies established in 1927